Pašušvys (formerly) is a village in Kėdainiai district municipality, in Kaunas County, in central Lithuania. According to the 2011 census, the village had a population of 91 people. There are a community house, a cemetery of the First World War victims, a former watermill (now in ruins), some buildings of the Pašušvys Manor, a former manor park. Nearby an ancient burial place is located. The Pašušvys Landscape Sanctuary is located by the Šušvė river. The Pašušvys forestry is in Skirgailinė village.

History
In 1585 Aklapuodis village was located in the current place of Pašušvys. Later, the manor emerged and Aklapuodis village was moved to other place in 1862 (now Plinkaigalis). At the end of the 19th century there were a watermill and St. Joachim chapel in the Pašušvys Manor.

During the Soviet era Pašušvys was a subsidiary kolhoz settlement. There were a sawmill, culture house, primary school (since 1959), communication station.

Demography

Images

References

Villages in Kaunas County
Kėdainiai District Municipality